António Almeida Henriques (5 May 1961 – 4 April 2021) was a Portuguese politician and lawyer. A member of the Social Democratic Party, he served as Mayor of Viseu from 2013 until his death in 2021, and as a member of the Assembly of the Republic from 2002 to 2011. He served as Deputy State Secretary for Economy and Regional Development in the XIX Constitutional Government of Portugal from 2011 to 2013.

António Almeida Henriques died of COVID-19 in Viseu on 4 April 2021, at the age of 59.

References

1961 births
2021 deaths
Portuguese politicians
Portuguese jurists
Mayors of places in Portugal
Members of the Assembly of the Republic (Portugal)
Social Democratic Party (Portugal) politicians
People from Viseu
Deaths from the COVID-19 pandemic in Portugal